Cephalaeschna  is a genus of dragonflies in the family Aeshnidae.

The genus contains the following species:
 Cephalaeschna acanthifrons Joshi & Kunte, 2017
 Cephalaeschna acutifrons (Martin, 1909)
 Cephalaeschna aipishishi Karube & Kompier, 2017
 Cephalaeschna algorei Karube & Kompier, 2017
 Cephalaeschna aritai Karube, 2003
 Cephalaeschna asahinai Karube, 2011
 Cephalaeschna chaoi Asahina, 1982
 Cephalaeschna cornifrons Zhang & Cai, 2013
 Cephalaeschna dinghuensis Wilson, 1999
 Cephalaeschna discolor Zhang, Cai & Liao, 2013
 Cephalaeschna klapperichi Schmidt, 1961
 Cephalaeschna klotsae Asahina, 1982 – yellow-spotted dusk-hawker
 Cephalaeschna masoni (Martin, 1909)
 Cephalaeschna mattii Zhang, Cai & Liao, 2013
 Cephalaeschna needhami Asahina, 1981
 Cephalaeschna obversa Needham, 1930
 Cephalaeschna orbifrons Selys, 1883
 Cephalaeschna ordopapiliones Zhang & Cai, 2013
 Cephalaeschna patrai Dawn, 2021
 Cephalaeschna patrorum Needham, 1930
 Cephalaeschna risi Asahina, 1981
 Cephalaeschna shaowuensis Xu, 2006
 Cephalaeschna solitaria Zhang, Cai & Liao, 2013
 Cephalaeschna triadica Lieftinck, 1977
 Cephalaeschna viridifrons (Fraser, 1922)
 Cephalaeschna xixiangensis Zhang, 2013
 Cephalaeschna yanagisawai Sasamoto & Vu, 2018
 Cephalaeschna yashiroi Sasamoto & Vu, 2021
 Cephalaeschna zhuae Yang, 2019

References

Aeshnidae
Anisoptera genera
Taxa named by Edmond de Sélys Longchamps
Taxonomy articles created by Polbot